Joyce Green, at Long Reach, near Dartford, was one of the first Royal Flying Corps (RFC) airfields. It was established in 1911 by Vickers Limited (the aircraft and weapons manufacturer) who used it as an airfield and testing ground. At the outbreak of World War I in 1914, the RFC followed and established a base. Subject to frequent flooding and a reputation as being unsuitable and too dangerous for training, it was eventually replaced by a more suitable site at RAF Biggin Hill.

There were two parts to Joyce Green's military operations; the RFC, and the Wireless Experimental establishment. The latter were the first to move out in 1917 (after exhaustive searching south of London) when they found an ideal site on a farmer's field near the village of Biggin Hill; the RFC were soon to recognize the new site's suitability for flying and its strategic location, and soon followed, transferring there on 13 February 1917. The RFC took with them their Bristol Fighters, leaving Joyce Green with only a pilots pool and ground crew. Once the RFC had moved out of the aerodrome, Vickers continued their testing work, until moving to Brooklands aerodrome. Following the Armistice with Germany the airfield was closed by December 1919.

The site 
The aerodrome itself was on part of a plot once known as Franks Farm, on ground reclaimed from the Dartford salt marshes.

The only habitation in the area, apart from the odd farm, was the isolated "Long Reach Tavern", known for organized bare-knuckle boxing matches in the 19th century, notably Tom Sayers who fought there between 1851-1854, and a ferry to Purfleet on the opposite bank of the Thames. A 'reach' is a length of a river between two bends and the longest reach on the Thames is 'Long Reach' hence the name of the Tavern. The surrounds of the tavern were to become the RFC encampment.

1:62260/1:50000 OS map sheets 171/177 : (51): OS survey grid reference: TQ 542774. County: Kent, Area : 121 acres : 1200 x 1000 yards. Slightly below sea level.

The airfield consisted of a grass landing field, slightly below sea level, criss-crossed by ditches covered with boards; a  site, 1200 x 1000 yards of low-lying marshland below mean tide level, bordered by the River Darent to the west, the Thames to the north, the tavern's access road "Joyce Green Lane" (running north to south) to the east, and the grounds of the Joyce Green Hospitals to the south.

Further to the west of the tavern across the estuary of the River Darent was the Thames Ammunition factory. Along the river to its east was the nearby Long Reach Hospital, where the three smallpox isolation hospital ships had been moored on the Reach; they had been scrapped in 1904 leaving just the adjacent land-based hospital facilities intact. Further to the south and east were the Dartford salt marshes.

Also in the area to the south were the Joyce Green and Orchard Hospitals with a small military (Army) unit attached to them. The hospitals were set up for the isolation of smallpox patients from London. Further to the south the main A206 road gave access to London. It is two miles from Dartford railway station and 1½ miles from Erith railway station.

The RFC buildings and camp were at the north end by the Thames, grouped to the immediate south and west of the Long Reach Tavern. The RFC had six hangars in total; three aeroplane sheds, 80 x 60 feet, as a treble unit, and another three sheds, 80 x 50 feet, as a treble unit.

Vickers 1910-1919 

The site was first used in 1910 by Hiram Maxim who in conjunction with Vickers had built a biplane at Crayford, and at Joyce Green unsuccessfully attempted a test flight; without funds to continue developing his ideas, Maxim parted company with Vickers to form a new company with Louis Bleriot and Claude Grahame White.

Vickers were to persist with aircraft development and establishing an (Aviation Department) in 1911, and promptly built hangars and workshop facilities at Joyce Green for testing the aeroplanes constructed at their Erith works. Vickers had factories at nearby Bexleyheath, Crayford, Erith and Dartford. The Vickers hangars and buildings were grouped at the south end of the site near to the entrance gates.

Once assembled aircraft were stripped down piece-small and moved by road from Erith, through the streets of Crayford to Joyce Green and returned the same way.

Vickers' first monoplane was tested at their new airfield in July 1911, using an under-license French-built rear fuselage and engine designed and made by the Frenchman Robert Esnault-Pelterie (hence R.E.P.) (the rest of the components being Vickers-built), it made its maiden flight, piloted by Captain Herbert F. Wood, the manager of Vickers' aviation department.

Development of the aircraft was rapid; the No. 8 monoplane was built by 1913 at the Erith factory. However the Army Manoeuvres in the autumn of 1912 proved disastrous for the type: four RFC officers were killed using monoplanes, and this led to a suspension of the type by the Military Wing.

Shortly before the war started, among the many designs initiated by the Drawing Office was one known as the 'Hydravion', based on the notion that an aeroplane should be able to take off from water as well as from land. Floats, made of Duralumin at the Dartford works, were tested in the nearby River Darent. Archives at the company headquarters imply that the Hydravion was to be constructed at Dartford, despite the factory only producing explosives and projectiles at the time.

In 1912 Vickers commenced work on a two-seat pusher biplane, the F.B.1 (Fighting Biplane 1), it was one of the first aircraft designed to carry a machine gun, the FB5 (fighting biplane) Gun Bus. The company abandoned plans for float planes at the start of the war and concentrated on land-based aircraft.

Vickers No. 8 monoplane at the Erith factory 1913.

In 1914, the company's works at Crayford took over the production of Vickers aircraft. Development of variants of F.B. series continued apace. The last of these variants the F.B.5, eventually emerged as the Gunbus; of the first batches two were sent to the RFC to be based at the airfield. Experimental work continued during the war evolving the basic Gunbus into the FB9, known as the 'Streamline Gunbus'.

During World War I it produced the Vimy heavy bomber; the FB27 Vimy Prototype built at the Vickers Crayford works was assembled and flown out of Joyce Green. The plane was found to be too large for the hangars; Vickers had to dig out the ground inside them, for them to fit. See photo, right.

This first prototype B9952 made its first flight on 30 November 1917 at Joyce Green, piloted by Capt. Gordon Bell. The company had planned to use a pair of Royal Aircraft Factory 200 hp 4d air-cooled V-12 engines, however they were not ready in time (production was later abandoned) and the plane was fitted two 200 hp Hispano-Suizas instead. By April 1918 it was decided use a Rolls-Royce Eagle engine instead. The aeroplane went into production that month and was at that point named the Vickers Vimy. Ironically, it was never used operationally in the First World War.

In 1919 Vickers moved their aircraft production from Crayford to Brooklands  aerodrome at Weybridge in Surrey. The plane's main claim to fame was that on 14/15 June 1919, Captain Jack Alcock and Lieutenant Arthur Whitten-Brown in a converted Vimy (built at Weybridge), made the world's first non-stop trans-oceanic flight, across the Atlantic. Later at the end of 1919 Ross and Keith Smith flew a Vimy all the way to Australia, thus highlighting the possibility of organising scheduled overseas longhaul flights.

Vickers would soon by December 1919 move their test facilities to Brooklands in Surrey.

Royal Flying Corps 1914–1919 

The Royal Flying Corps (RFC) was established in May 1912. Initially the RFC regularly visited Joyce Green for testing and reviewing prototype aircraft. After the outbreak of war in 1914, Joyce Green became an ‘air defence’ airfield to protect London from bombing raids by Zeppelins. The airfield was to house a permanent RFC unit, under No. 6 Wing, and the first occupants were No. 10 Reserve Squadron with a variety of aircraft including Henry Farman's, Vickers FB5 and FB9, DH2 and FE8 machines. The role of this unit was to receive pupils from preliminary training schools for final training for their wings. Each course consisted of about 20 pupils and lasted two or three weeks. This included time spent at Lydd where aerial gunnery was practised at the Hythe range. On gaining their wings the young pilots would get a 48-hour pass before being posted to the Front.

It was decided that the aerodrome should house two FB5 Gunbuses, and they were transferred from Netheravon. No.6 Wing was appointed to oversee operations, and the training of potential pilots.

Concurrently the erection of hangars, workshops and ground staff quarters commenced at the northern edge of the landing field alongside the Long Reach Tavern.

On Christmas Day 1914, the field was to see its first action when 2Lt M. R. Chidson and gunner Cpl Martin were in a Gunbus were sent up in pursuit of a German plane, Friedrichshafen FF.29, a single-engined, two-seater float plane belonging to See Flieger-Abteilung I (Flyer department I) of the Imperial German Navy, based at Zeebrugge in Belgium. Unfortunately the gun jammed over Purfleet, and the gunner (having forgotten his gloves) found his hands too cold could not clear the mechanism, thus leaving the German free to drop two bombs on Cliffe railway station. Nevertheless, the Gunship did chase the German aircraft as far as the Nore sandbank. At the time the German plane was mistaken as a Taube monoplane it being an aircraft type that people knew (in the same way that Second World War German pilots always claimed to have been shot down by a Spitfire, when it was probably a Hurricane).

The airfield soon proved unpopular, being situated primarily on marshland.

Early in 1915, the construction of the Royal Flying Corps base at Joyce Green was completed and No.10 Reserve Squadron moved in. Equipped with Henry Farman, Vickers FB5 and FB9, DH2 and FE8 aeroplanes, the squadron's main function was to receive pupils from preliminary training schools for final training and qualifications for their wings. There were many accidents and quite a few trainee pilots were killed. The Long Reach Tavern, was closed, the Salmon family were moved out, and the RFC took it over as a canteen and used it for sleeping quarters.

On 19–20 January 1915 the Imperial German Navy mounted the first airship raid on Britain. Three Zeppelins (L3, L4 and L6) were despatched; one was forced to turn back with engine difficulties 90 miles from the English coast. The remaining airships bombed Great Yarmouth and King's Lynn, killing 2 civilians of Yarmouth and injuring 3, and killing 2 and injuring 13 civilians of King's Lynn. These were the first British Military casualties due to air attack.

The first night air defence sorties are flown by the Royal Flying Corps (RFC). Following the attack by Zeppelins L3 and L4, two Vickers FB5 Gunbuses of No.7 Squadron were ordered to take-off from Joyce Green and patrol over the southern outskirts of London, without result.

James Thomas Byford McCudden VC DSO (and Bar), MC (and Bar), Croix de Guerre, one of the most highly decorated air aces in the First World War, arrived at Joyce Green in March 1917 to take up the appointment of Wing Fighting Instructor. McCudden had shot down fifty-seven German aeroplanes by the time he was 22. His job involved teaching combat duties to the more advanced pupils.

In mid April 1915, No. 39 Home Defence Squadron was formed bringing together all units and detachments detailed for anti-Zeppelin raid duties in the London area.

In October 1915 a BE2c was posted here, and the machine fitted with a bomb rack. On October 13 the station would put up five aircraft against Zeppelins L13, L14, L15, and L16; two would land safely after the action. In particular 2/Lt Claude Ridley took off from Joyce Green in a BE2c and spotted the airship for a brief moment in searchlights. He fired off 20 rounds at extreme range but then lost sight of the airship.

Dartford played an important role in the defence of London. Anti-aircraft guns were sited on the River Brent, Dartford Heath and the Dartford Marshes, and dozens of searchlights and listening posts were erected in the district. The total number of air raids in or near Dartford (1914–18) was thirty-seven. Despite large numbers of high explosive and incendiary bombs dropped on the area, no-one was killed in Dartford as a direct result of these air raids.

Zeppelins generated enough fear that the lord mayor of London offered a £500 prize to the first pilot or gun crew to shoot one down on British soil, an award claimed by members of an anti-aircraft gun emplacement sited on the Brent at Dartford. The gun crew played an important part in bringing down Zeppelin L15.

The units and detachments under No.19 reserve squadron around London for anti-zeppelin defence were reorganized on 15 April 1916 as the No.39 Home Defence Squadron. Zeppelin operations moved to the north of London leaving Joyce Green on the southern perimeter.

On 22 March 1917 McCudden arrived to instruct advanced students (including Mannock) on combat techniques. McCudden would return here two more times in his career in Nov 1917 and Apr 1918.

Later in Autumn 1917 the threat came from Gotha bombers which had started raiding London. The Gotha had been based at Ostend as early as the spring of 1917. In one week that year, the German planes passed over Dartford three nights in succession; the Brent guns firing nearly a thousand rounds at the raiders.

63 TS were moved to Redcar on 13 February 1919, and the aerodrome was left only a pilots pool; and ground crew mainly composed of USAAF personnel on final training duties awaiting deployment to France.

Wireless Testing Park 

In 1914 the RFC took over the Marconi Company experimental section at Brooklands in Surrey (formed in early 1911) and turned it into a wireless training school for pilots and engineers; under the command of Major Charles Prince, a former a Marconi engineer. The existing regulations had been that all communications work for the RFC had to be undertaken by the Royal Engineers. This resulted in conflicts of interest and views between the two organisations and things rapidly came to a head, and a decision was taken to separate the two bodies, resulting was that in August 1915 most of the wireless research work was sent to Woolwich, and the RFC wireless staff were despatched to a new site at Joyce Green.

The move was at first welcomed, as despite its pre-war success the Brooklands aerodrome was unsuitable for training and testing due to close proximity of high obstacles and electrical interference.

The Wireless Testing Park moved to this busy airfield in August 1915 on a convoy of trucks. Training, testing and wireless experiments, and work started. immediately while around them young men practised war, throwing flour bombs as they tried to make their cumbersome Henry Farman Trainers fly. The first ground to air upward message was sent in 1915 at the aerodrome by Major Prince, calling Captain J. M. Furnival as he circled the field in his aircraft. 
'Hello Furnie. If you can hear me now it will be the first time speech has ever been communicated to an aeroplane in flight.' 'Hello Furnie if you can hear me dip your wings". The aeroplane, at its top speed of 50 mph, responded with 'an obedient lurch.'

Despite ongoing bureaucratic difficulties the team successfully and developed a practical aircraft telephony set towards the end of 1915; the Mark One weighing only 20 lbs (9 kg). This being the first operational air to ground wireless telephony equipment in the world. Prince made a report:
‘It seemed almost beyond hope to achieve really practical wireless telephony from an aeroplane, but the difficulties have been overcome, and the new set is by no means a toy, or only of scientific interest. A new and amazing power is conferred by it.’

By May 1916, 306 aircraft and 542 ground stations were equipped with spark wireless and crystal set receivers.

Also, despite Princes best attempts, four-fifths of the work for the RFC was officially still undertaken by the Royal Engineers Signals Experimental Establishment. Only one RFC officer was allowed on the premises at any one time, and he was unable to bring any influence to bear the designs and equipment they produced. Of a dozen new sets the RFC submitted to the Wireless Testing Park, all were subjected to damning comments such as ‘a monument of incompetence’ ‘hopelessly bad design’ and ‘a primitive attempt to get round real difficulties’.

As time progressed it became ever more apparent that the field of aviation radiophonics was too different from that of the army that the two services required to be separated.

Reasons why Joyce Green was replaced by Biggin Hill 

Air Vice Marshal Gould Lee wrote in his book "Open Cockpit", chapter 17: ‘To use this waterlogged field for testing every now and then was reasonable and to take advantage of it as an emergency landing ground for Home Defence forces was credible, but to employ it as a flying training station was folly and as a Camel training station was lunacy. A pupil taking off with a choked or failing engine had to choose, according to wind direction, between drowning in the Thames (half a mile wide at this point), or crashing into the Vickers TNT works, or hitting one of their several high chimney stacks, or sinking into a vast sewage farm, or killing himself and numerous patients in a large isolation hospital, or being electrocuted in an electrical substation with acres of pylons and cables; or trying to turn and get back to the aerodrome. Unfortunately, many pupils confronted with disaster tried the last course and span to their deaths.’

Jimmy McCudden VC in his book "Flying Fury" described the airfield (where he and others like of Mick Mannock VC spent much time) as a "quiet little spot near Dartford", below sea level at the side of the Thames. The Corp resided in a wooden barrack block, and the actual airfield (grass runways) were located almost next to the River Thames, where many pilots lost their lives by drowning.

The Wireless Radio Unit found the foul weather, incessant mist, the state of the ground, the cold, and damp at Joyce Green non conducive to the best research. Numerous accidents, several fatalities and the planned formation of the Royal Air Force in 1918, led to the Wireless Testing Park eventually being moved in February 1917 to Biggin Hill.

The Sopwith Camel was a demanding plane of all but the most experienced pilot, and had had a fearsome reputation for spinning out of control during tight turns, causing the deaths of many young pilots during their training period.

US Army Air Service 1917-1919 
Prior to its eventual closure, the airfield hosted some of the earliest elements of the US Army Air Service to arrive in Europe. Three flights of the 8th Aero Squadron USAAS arrived on 24 Dec 2017, soon to be dispersed elsewhere, leaving a ground unit which eventually departed in May 2018 for Thetford.

None of the many USAS squadrons in the UK were flying units. When squadrons arrived from the States, pilots were attached to British units for further training and some were attached to operational squadrons in France. The ground crews were attached to British training units to learn maintenance procedures. A considerable number of USAS squadrons were construction squadrons and had no flying or maintenance personnel; they were charged with aerodrome construction.

Ground crew from the 149th Aero Squadron an Instructional flying squadron (Pursuit), were here in May 2018. The squadron was established 7 December 1917, and assigned to the American Expeditionary Force (AEF) from 5 March 1918. It was transferred to France to the 3d Air Instructional Center at Issoudun Aerodrome, and demobilized March 1919. One of the aircrew Private Carroll H. Bunch, an aerial photographer, took several photographs of the field and facilities when the squadron was based there.

Ground crew elements of the 159th Aero Squadron a Day Bombardment) squadron, were here sometime between 15 March, and 25 October 1918. The squadron was established 7 December 1917, and assigned to the American Expeditionary Force (AEF), it was transferred to France from Codford on 2 November.

Closure 

After a Whitsun public display in May 1919, Vickers began pulling out for Brooklands in earnest.

Following the Armistice with Germany Joyce Green was declared surplus to requirements in October 1919 and was restored to agricultural use by Dec. All of the hangars had been dismantled by 1939.

The Long Reach Tavern would eventually close in 1957, and was demolished in the late 1950s.

Role of Operations

Royal Flying Corps / Royal Air Force: resident units and aircraft

Wing chain of command 

Notes:
Units and location marked with an * were ground units and non-flying stations.
HD = Home Defence
NLG = Night Landing Ground
RAS = Reserve Aeroplane Squadron: when the squadrons of the RFC went to France in 1914, the remaining machines were grouped into the original Reserve Aeroplane Squadron, which became a training unit. When further such units were formed, numbering was introduced.
RS = Reserve Squadron: the RAS was re-tiled RS in January 1916 and by July of that year was classified as either Elementary (for initial training) or Higher (for type specialisation). 10 RS was one of the latter, being dedicated to turning out pilots for 'pusher' scouts, DH2 and FE8.
TDS = Training Depot Station: these were introduced during the autumn of 1917 in an attempt to streamline the training system. Hitherto, pilots had undertaken elementary training at one station and moved to another for higher training - a waste of time and resources. TDS provided all-through training and had type specialisations.
TS = Training Squadron: the RS were re-designated TS on 31 May 1917, to more accurately reflect their role. That coincided with 10 TS switching bases with 63 TS, as a response to the Gotha raids on SE England - 63 TS had Sopwith Pups and DH5s as part of its equipment and was given temporary HD duty.
The Wireless Testing Park had arrived as a nucleus from Brooklands and was an out-station of the Signals Experimental Establishment at Woolwich. 
No. 63 TS was given temporary HD duty during the summer of 1917. 
The Pool of Pilots comprised a concentration of pilots awaiting posting to units at home and overseas.
 Above three tables are from the National Archives. The six-part RAF Quarterly Survey of Stations, Autumn 1918 (AIR 1/452/15/312/26 & AIR 1/453/15/312/26).

Some notable officers who served at the aerodrome 
Mick Mannock
James McCudden
Harry Goode
Albert Gregory Waller
Selden Herbert Long
A. S. G. Lee
Herman W von Poellnitz ("Von Pip")
G. R. McCubbin who shot down Max Immelmann
G. W. Mapplebeck

Gallery

The dashed line on the plan from the RAF Quarterly Survey of Stations, Autumn 1918, indicates the aerodrome boundaries - as it does on all the plans in TNA AIR1 452 and 453. The RFC/RAF buildings were mainly on the northern boundary, in and around Long Reach Tavern. The Vickers buildings to the far south. The plan was drawn on existing 25 mile to the inch OS maps, so existing surrounding buildings show, e.g. Outside the base is the Joyce Green hospital in the far SE corner. The Orchard Hospital to its immediate left.

Accidents and incidents

Some notable accidents and incidents involving military aircraft:

The first fatalities occurred on 13 January 1913 when a new biplane design, converted from a Vickers No.6 Monoplane, on a test flight, came down in the River Thames. The Vicker's pilot, Leslie McDonald, and his mechanic, Harry English, were drowned. The publican of the Tavern (and retired waterman) Richard Salmon (1843-1915), witnessed the accident and gave evidence at the inquest in Dartford. The Coroner concluded that the accident had occurred as a result of a sudden loss of power to the engine.
The incident didn't deter Richard from flying as he later experienced a joyride from the aerodrome, at age 69/70.

Captain Gilbert William Mapplebeck DSO (22) (Gibb Mapplebeck) 1892-1915. was posted to No 2 Reserve Air Squadron in August 1915 to carry out flight tests. On 24 August Mapplebeck (a recognized ace) after taking off in a Morane-Saulnier N “Bullet” climbed to 80 feet and then entered a sharp right-hand turn. The plane stalled and spun into the ground. Mapplebeck was killed. Noel Pemberton-Billing MP asked questions in Parliament and it was investigated in 1916. Billing claimed that the plane was of a type condemned by the French air force and that there was a problem with the safety belt. The verdict of the Board of Inquiry on 25 August concluded that the French had indeed in large part taken the plane out of service, and that it would have been negligent to put an inexperienced pilot in such a machine, however Mapplebeck was an ‘expert’ so it was not negligent; the crash was caused by ‘an unfortunate error of judgment on the pilot’s part’, and “that the accident was due to the machine ‘spinning’ on a heavily banked turn, the pilot not having sufficient height to regain control before hitting the earth.”

Major Ernest Frederic Unwin (35), died 22 March 1916 in a B.E.2c, 10 RS, hit a tree on a night approach and caught fire, at Joyce Green.

Capt Bert James (22) RAF, was killed at Joyce Green May 1918, within sight of the airfield as witnessed by Carroll Bunch.

2Lt Edwin John Leslie Lonnen (27) killed 16 August 1916 in Vickers FB.9 5273, 10 RS, at Joyce Green. Stalled in turn and nose dived.

Lt Harold Staples Brewster (22) (Canadian) killed 6 December 1916 in a D.H.2 A4988, 10 RS, Joyce Green, Nose dived and crashed, at Dover.

Lt Henry Richard Deighton Simpson (20), RFC (American) killed 20 December 1916 in a Vickers F.B.16A, Vickers Ltd. Crashed on test - 'excessive strain on machine', at Joyce Green.

Lt. Sydney Esmond O’Hanlon Mid. MC. (23) 63 Squadron, killed 29 January 1918. While instructing on 29 January 1918, another aircraft gone out of control, hit O'Hanlon's Sopwith Pup, and he was seriously injured. Died on 3 February.

Vickers test pilot Harold Barnwell, (39) flying solo in a Vickers F.B.26 Vampire, B1484 crashed at Joyce Green, when he attempted a spin without sufficient altitude for recovery. Pilot KWF.

Partial list of incidents

Legacy

North Kent Nomads Flying Club 
One of the fields is used by this Large Radio Controlled Model Aircraft club.

Wells Fireworks Factory 
In 1938 a long-established English firework maker Joseph Wells and Sons Limited acquired land between the Orchard Hospital and what was the Aerodrome. A part of the aerodrome site was included; where the RAF Officers mess had been located near the main gate. Wells had been originally established in 1837 at Earlsfield and Camberwell in London. To meet increasing demands and compliance with the requirements of the Explosives Act 1875, they had opened a new factory at Honor Oak Park in 1878, just north of the railway station.

They also opened a factory in 1915 at Colchester to supplement Honor Oaks' production. Colchester was closed in 1938 when the new factory was built at Joyce Green, Dartford. The Honor Oak factory was closed in 1947 and the construction sheds from the old factory were transported to the Joyce Green site. Wells carried on production of fireworks until the family sold the site in 1968.

References

Bibliography

External links

List of RFC/RAF Personnel 1915-18 at the airfield, including personnel from Nos 2, 3RS, 16, 27, 32, 62, 80 and 103 Squadrons

Royal Air Force stations in Kent
Royal Flying Corps airfields
Royal Flying Corps airfields in Kent
Borough of Dartford
History of Kent